Lashina is a supervillainess and Goddess warrior appearing in comics published by DC Comics.

Publication history
Created by Jack Kirby, the character first appeared in Mister Miracle #6 (January 1972).

Fictional character biography
Lashina was raised a warrior in Granny Goodness's orphanage, and took over leadership of the Female Furies when Big Barda left Apokolips for Earth. Though the Furies initially stayed on Earth to aid Big Barda and her lover, Mister Miracle, they soon returned to Apokolips to take their punishment for their betrayal of Darkseid. Lashina is then given leadership over the Female Furies by Darkseid, much to fellow Fury Bernadeth's annoyance.

During a mission to capture Glorious Godfrey, a New God that had been imprisoned on Earth, Lashina was betrayed by Bernadeth as the Female Furies were escaping through a boom tube. Caught in an explosion, Lashina is sent flying into the swamp surrounding Belle Reve Penitentiary. Surviving the blast, she remained in the swamp until an opportunity to save an injured member of the Suicide Squad, a United States government agency that uses super-powered beings to fulfill black ops missions, presents itself. Using the opportunity to ingratiate herself with the team and claiming to be suffering from amnesia, Amanda Waller allowed Lashina to join. Quickly dubbed Duchess by the support staff due to her haughty demeanor, she became a critical part of the Squad and participated in almost every one of the team's missions during her time as a member. Eventually, she engineered a return to Apokolips and convinced many members of the Squad to come with her, while others she outright kidnapped. The plan ended in a battle against Apokolips forces once the group lands on the planet's surface. Multiple Squad members were killed, including Doctor Light. During the battle, Lashina confronted and killed Bernadeth. Darkseid, furious that Lashina has brought humans to Apokolips, revived Bernadeth and killed Lashina with his omega beams. The survivors of the Suicide Squad were allowed to return home.

Lashina was later resurrected by Darkseid and sent with the Furies on another mission to retrieve Mister Miracle, but he escaped.

Sharing leadership with Bernadeth, Lashina often served as the field leader of the Furies, while Bernadeth led them off the battlefield. Lashina has since battled Young Justice, the Birds of Prey and Wonder Woman. She is also a long-time enemy of Superman and his compatriots Superboy and Supergirl. In recent appearances she has been seen battling Firestorm, Orion and Hawkgirl.

Seven Soldiers
Lashina appears in Seven Soldiers: Mister Miracle, part of Grant Morrison's Seven Soldiers maxi-series event. Within the story, Lashina and the rest of the Furies are given human form by Darkseid. She and the rest of the Furies battle Shilo Norman in an attempt to stop him in his quest to free Aurakles, the world's first superhero.

Final Crisis
During the Final Crisis, Lashina, once again in her bald-headed human form, is seen as one of the villains running the Dark Side Club, an illegal arena where spectators gamble on battles between brainwashed teen metahumans. When Rose Wilson and Miss Martian lead a rebellion against the Dark Side Club staff, Lashina attempts to flee along with the wealthy club patrons in the VIP section of the arena. They nearly escape the club, but are cut off by teen superhero Static, who proceeds to electrocute Lashina and the others into unconsciousness, turning them over to the authorities afterwards.

When the Anti-Life Equation takes effect across the globe, several superheroines and villainesses are taken under Darkseid's power and are transformed into the new Female Furies. Catwoman apparently becomes the new Lashina, wearing an outfit similar to hers. In the aftermath of the series, Lashina is presumably reborn on Earth-51, along with the rest of the Jack Kirby-created characters.

The New 52
Lashina makes her first appearance alongside Granny Goodness in issue #8 of Infinity Man and the Forever People. During the Darkseid War, Lashina and Kanto traveled to Earth to hunt down the renegade amazon Myrina Black. Later, after Darkseid had been enslaved by his daughter Grail, Lashina and the other Female Furies accepted an offer from Big Barda to help defeat Grail as well as to protect Barda's husband, Mister Miracle. Lashina participated in the final battle against Grail and Darkseid, which resulted in the pair's defeat. Lashina then left for Apokolips with the rest of the Furies, including Barda.

DC Rebirth
After the events of the "Darkseid War" left Apokolips without a ruler, Lashina joined Granny Goodness and several other Furies who had remained loyal to Darkseid on the outskirts of the planet called the Deadlands. She later participated in the battle against Kalibak's forces, though she was eventually defeated by her teammate Lois Lane after the Furies turned on the human when she revealed her relationship with Superman. Lashina was imprisoned on Apokolips with Stompa, Mad Harriet, and Granny Goodness when Superman became ruler of the planet.

At some point later, Lashina and her comrades were freed from their imprisonment by Darkseid, who had been slowly regaining his power on Earth. Along with the other Female Furies, Lashina was assigned to seek out mystical artifacts that would further empower Darkseid. Steve Trevor and his team of soldiers called the Oddfellows prevented Lashina and the Furies from stealing the relics, and in the ensuing battle Lashina, along with Mad Harriet, was captured. Both Lashina and Mad Harriet refused to answer Wonder Woman's questions about Darkseid's plans which led to Wonder Woman freeing the two Furies and attempting to battle them for answers. The battle was interrupted by Darkseid, who had transported a chunk of the A.R.G.U.S. headquarters to his lair in the Amazon jungle. During the chaos, Lashina battled the soldiers of A.R.G.U.S. and later fled when Darkseid was apparently killed by Wonder Woman.

During the escalation of the war between Apokolips and New Genesis, Lashina attended the birth of Jacob, the son of Big Barda and Mister Miracle.

Granny Goodness soon took an interest in Harley Quinn, sending Lashina and Bernadeth to recruit the former criminal. While Lashina distracted Quinn, Bernadeth pricked her in the back with a knockout poison. The two then took Quinn to Apokolips where she officially became a Fury.

Powers and abilities
Lashina has the conventional attributes of all the New Gods. She is extremely long-lived and superhumanly strong, immune to all earthly diseases and resistance to conventional injury. Lashina can lift at least 40 tons and her incredible physiology gives her superhuman endurance. Lashina has had intensive training in unarmed combat. She uses steel whips that she can charge with electricity and also can destroy even metallic objects easily.

Lashina is vulnerable to a substance called Radion. Its source is currently unknown, its effects are toxic only in sustained amounts or after explosive exposure. Radion is able to weaken her to a point she is able to be defeated, but since she is not an average new god, Lashina will not be defeated that easily. Lashina can take a few hits from a cannon or blaster of Radion.

Other versions

Amalgam
In the Marvel/DC amalgam series Unlimited Access, Lashina merges with Scarlet Witch and becomes a female villain known as Red Lash.

Ame-Comi Girls
Lashina is a member of Big Barda's space pirates.

Sensation Comics Featuring Wonder Woman
Lashina appears in the story "Dig For Fire" in the anthology series Sensation Comics Featuring Wonder Woman. After discovering that Wonder Woman had traveled to Apokolips to save two of her amazon sisters, Lashina along with Stompa and Mad Harriet tracked her down. The Furies refused to speak peacefully to Wonder Woman, and in the ensuing battle, the heroine was shot in the neck by an explosive dart from Bernadeth and thrown into the fiery pits by Stompa. When the Furies reported back to Darkseid, he was displeased that they had killed her rather than executing her publicly. Wonder Woman, still alive, managed to save her sisters. The Furies once again battled the amazon, though the battle ended when Darkseid killed the two amazons and allowed Wonder Woman to return to Earth.

In other media

Television

 Lashina appears on Superman: The Animated Series, voiced by Diane Michelle. Her first appearance was in the two-parter "Little Girl Lost", where she, along with Stompa and Mad Harriet, were summoned by Granny Goodness to battle Supergirl. Lashina was the leader of the Furies, and fought Supergirl at the end of the episode. She also appeared later during the series finale two-parter, "Legacy", where she apparently had a romantic relationship with the brainwashed Superman, but attacked him when he turned on them.
 Lashina also appeared in Justice League Unlimited in the first part of the series finale, "Alive".
 Lashina appeared in the Batman: The Brave and the Bold episode "Duel of the Double Crossers!", voiced by Nika Futterman. She, along with Stompa, was a member of Mongul's Furies. She had a romantic interest in Jonah Hex, and flirted with him during battle, later   After Mongul and Mongal were defeated, Lashina rode off into the sunset with Jonah Hex.
 Lashina (played by Jonel Earl) is briefly seen in the episode "Abandoned" on the last season of Smallville. She tries to choke Tess Mercer to death until Clark Kent intervenes and stops her.
 Lashina appears in the web series DC Super Hero Girls, voiced by Jessica DiCicco.
 Lashina appears in a non-speaking role in the Justice League Action episode "It'll Take a Miracle". She accompanies Granny Goodness and Bernadeth into competing against Batman to get the Anti-Life Equation.
 Lashina appears in the Young Justice: Outsiders episode "Influence".

Film
 Lashina appears in Superman/Batman: Apocalypse, voiced by an uncredited Tara Strong.
 An alternate version of Lashina briefly appears in Justice League: Gods and Monsters. This version resembles her appearance from Superman: The Animated Series.
 Lashina appears in DC Super Hero Girls: Intergalactic Games, voiced by Jessica DiCicco. Lashina frees the other Female Furies, and under Granny Goodness's leadership, joins the Intergalactic Games.
 Lashina appears in Lego DC Super Hero Girls: Brain Drain, voiced by Meredith Salenger.
 Lashina appears in Lego DC Super Hero Girls: Super-Villain High, voiced once again by Meredith Salenger. This version is a member of  Lena Luthor's team of villains under the name Backlash.

Video games
 Lashina appears in DC Universe Online, voiced by Jen Brown.
 Lashina is a summonable character in Scribblenauts Unmasked: A DC Comics Adventure.
 Lashina appears as a support card in the mobile version of Injustice: Gods Among Us. She also appears in Darkseid's special move.
 Lashina appears as a playable character in Lego DC Super-Villains, voiced by Grey Griffin. She is unlocked after completing the mission "These Boots Were Made For Stompa" where the player battles and defeats her alongside Stompa and Mad Harriet.

Toys
 A 3.75" action figure of Lashina was made for the DC Universe: Justice League line in 2005. She was included in the set "Attack From Apokolips", which included several other New Gods such as Darkseid and Mantis.
 A Lego version of Lashina appears in the Lashina's Tank (41233) set from the DC Super Hero Girls series.

References

New Gods of Apokolips
Comics characters introduced in 1972
Characters created by Jack Kirby
Fictional prostitutes
DC Comics aliens
DC Comics characters with superhuman strength
DC Comics deities
DC Comics demons
DC Comics female supervillains